Helen Pheby is an art curator who currently works as Associate Director, Programme, at Yorkshire Sculpture Park. Dr Pheby was Vice Chair of the Civic art gallery and theatre in Barnsley; the Chair of UP Projects, London (2019-22); curatorial advisor to ArtRole in Iraqi Kurdistan and NIROX in South Africa. She is also a Cultural Fellow of York St John University and was an advisor to the Arts Council Collection Acquisition Committee (2016–17).  Dr Pheby is regularly invited to undertake international lectures and tours including Sculpture Dublin (2020); Park 3020, Ukraine (2019); the Contemporary Austin, USA (2017) and as the guest of Creative India (2013). Helen has collaborated with Selfridges since 2018 to curate the Duke Street entrance to their flagship London store.

Career 

Pheby's PhD thesis considered controversial public sculpture as a means to better understand art's place in a healthy society. which is evolved through debate and understanding,

Pheby has worked with international partners to co-curate several offsite projects including the Kyiv Sculpture Project (2012).  In 2016 she curated 'A Place in Time' at the NIROX sculpture foundation in the UNESCO Cradle of Humankind, South Africa.

Pheby's 2016 exhibition 'Beyond Boundaries: Art by Email' in collaboration with ArtRole in Kurdistan-Iraq gave a platform to artists in the Middle East and North Africa whose political and other circumstances made it very difficult for them to travel to the UK.

References 

Living people
Date of birth missing (living people)
British curators
People from Barnsley
Year of birth missing (living people)